Böyük Pirəli (also, Beyuk-Pirelli, Beyuk-Piraly, and Bëyuk Pirali) is a village and municipality in the Qabala Rayon of Azerbaijan.  As of 2014, it has a population of 1,362.

References 

Populated places in Qabala District